Developmental editing is a form of writing support that comes into play before or during the production of a publishable manuscript, in both fiction and non-fiction writing. As explained by Scott Norton in his book Developmental editing: a handbook for freelancers, authors, and publishers, developmental editing involves "significant structuring or restructuring of a manuscript's discourse". Developmental editors are a type of language professional.

The work of developmental editors
A developmental editor may guide an author (or group of authors) in conceiving the topic, planning the overall structure, and developing an outline—and may coach authors in their writing, chapter by chapter. This is true developmental editing, but not the most common way of working. A complete developmental edit involves addressing organization and restructuring the manuscript, such as moving content from one chapter to another and requesting additional content from the author. More commonly, a developmental editor is engaged only after someone (usually the publisher) decides that the authors' draft requires substantial revision and restructuring. In these cases, developmental editing is a radical form of substantive editing.

Irrespective of when the developmental editor is brought into a writing project, authors retain control over the document and are responsible for providing the content. Developmental editors typically don't make the changes directly to the manuscript but instead provide guidance and suggestions, although some "hands-on editing is used to illustrate principles of craft and mechanics." An editor who creates significant amounts of content is no longer an editor but a contributing author or a ghostwriter. After completing a developmental edit, an editor typically provides a letter to the author (often in the form of an email) explaining the main suggestions.

A developmental editor aims to make a very marketable book that answers the intended audience’s needs. If by the end of a book/publication the reader doesn’t feel their needs have been met (that the publication didn’t deliver on its promises), then the developmental editor hasn’t done their job in helping meet the mission and vision set out in the book’s proposal. As the book proposal is based on solid research of audience needs and competitor publications, it’s really important to meet the aims set out in it.

In a traditional publishing house, developmental editors work with an author to refine the manuscript. Many publishing houses today, however, do little developmental editing. Instead, they rely on agents to vet and submit manuscripts that are already in shape, reducing the work required in the developmental editing stage.

Textbooks
Textbooks represent one book genre in which developmental editors are involved from the beginning, and often serve as the book's project manager.  Their role is fundamental in textbook publishing because it is often the publisher, not the author, who decides on the book's content, scope, and level. Thus, developmental editors are often on staff at scholastic publishing houses. In textbook publishing, the developmental editor may be responsible for creating the outline to guide the author's writing—and may also prepare short parts of text, such as legends, exercises, and supporting materials. Furthermore, the editor manages text length, edits the developing manuscript, and may instruct an artist regarding illustrations.

In the setting of academic research
In the academic research setting, career advancement and funding depend on the number and quality of published papers. However, not all researchers are naturally skilled writers, especially among those in the hard and clinical sciences, and many do not receive formal training in how to write the specific genre of the research paper. These researchers can benefit from a language professional such as a teacher of academic writing or an authors' editor who provides substantive editing. In extreme cases, when the drafted manuscript does not match the genre and requires substantial restructuring before being able to meet readers' and peer reviewers' expectations, the language professional may offer developmental editing; however certain professional and ethical issues must be considered.

There are two main situations when developmental editing in the research setting can be useful. First, researchers may recognize their inability to produce a manuscript with reasonable chances of passing peer review in their target journal; they may contact a language professional for assistance and guidance during the writing process. In addition, researchers whose manuscript has suffered multiple rejections from different journals may seek help resolving the complex issues raised by peer reviewers. In both cases, the type of writing support goes beyond author editing and becomes a form of academic mentoring. Mentoring programs using a developmental editing approach to teach scholarly writing skills have been offered, for example, by an international education journal and at a US medical school. Developmental editing is also at the heart of AuthorAID, a program that matches authors from the developing world with experienced scientist mentors and professional editors to improve the dissemination of knowledge from poor countries.

Whether the language professional is an authors' editor, a teacher of academic writing, or a translator, the particularly challenging situation requires developmental editing alongside other writing support services (e.g., education about good writing practices, translation, and linguistic editing). Language professionals who support such novice researcher-authors know to perform editorial—not authorial—duties, so they avoid ghost writing if authorship is not wanted.

Fiction 
The tasks that developmental editors face in fiction are fairly different from those faced by editors working with nonfiction. In fiction, developmental editors address any key problems they find in a manuscript regarding plot, character development, pacing, and other big picture issues. They ask big-picture questions such as "Are the characters likeable?" and "Are the chapters and paragraphs in the right order?" For example, an editor would take a finished manuscript and provide ideas for fixing plot holes, inconsistencies in characters, scenes that need more depth, and scenes that need to be cut.

References 

Editing
Book publishing